Biomarkers is a peer-reviewed academic journal covering research on biomarkers. It is published by Taylor & Francis and the editor-in-chief is Martin Möckel  (Charité). According to the Journal Citation Reports, the journal has a 2015 impact factor of 2.016.

References

External links

Publications established in 1996
Taylor & Francis academic journals
English-language journals
Biochemistry journals